Rakotomalala is a common Malagasy last name. Malagasy are citizens of Madagascar, the largest island in the Indian Ocean. Rakoto is a common root for many Malagasy last names. Malala means "beloved". The name is so common that it is shared by a former prime minister, a UN representative and a singer who are not related. There are Rakotomalala present in 14 different countries, which is a large number for a total Malagasy population of only 15 million people.

People
 Andriantsilavo Frédéric Rakotomalala, Malagasy politician
 François Emile Rakotomalala, Malagasy politician
 Jean-Jacques Rakotomalala (born 1965), Malagasy judoka
 Jérôme Rakotomalala (1914-1975), Archbishop of Antananarivo
 Joël Rakotomalala (1929-1976), Malagasy politician
 Mandresy Rakotomalala, French tennis player

References

Surnames
Malagasy-language surnames
Surnames of Malagasy origin